Grandsaigne is a commune in the Corrèze department of central France.

Population

See also
Communes of the Corrèze department

References

Communes of Corrèze